Finis Malorum is an EP by Swedish black/death metal band Sacramentum. The EP was released by the band themselves but was re-released through Adipocere Records a year later. The EP is considered a rare underground gem by many fans.

Track listing 
All songs written by Sacramentum

Personnel
Nisse Karlén - vocals, rhythm guitar, lyrics
Anders Brolycke - lead guitar, lyrics (track 4)
Freddy Andersson - bass
Mikael Rydén - drums

References

1994 EPs
Sacramentum (band) albums
Albums produced by Dan Swanö